Bert Steltenpool (born 5 May 1994) is a Dutch professional footballer who currently plays as a striker for Spakenburg in the Dutch Derde Divisie.

Personal life
He is a son of former Volendam defender Eric Steltenpool, who played 83 Eredivisie games for FC Volendam.

References

External links
 

1994 births
Living people
Association football forwards
Dutch footballers
Eerste Divisie players
FC Volendam players
People from Wervershoof
Footballers from North Holland